Arthur Tusten "Tus" Ackerman (October 7, 1901 May 17, 1997) was an American basketball player in the early days of college and semi-professional basketball.

Ackerman, a 6'3 forward/center from Lawrence, Kansas, played for coach Phog Allen at Kansas from 1922 to 1925.  At the University of Kansas, he was a starter on the 1922–23 Jayhawk team that was retroactively named national champions by the Helms Athletic Foundation and was named an All-American by that same organization for both 1924 and 1925.

Following his collegiate career, Ackerman played Amateur Athletic Union basketball for the Kansas City Athletic Club, where he was named an AAU All-American in 1925 and 1926.

Ackerman's jersey was retired by the University of Kansas and hangs in Allen Fieldhouse.

Notes

1901 births
1997 deaths
All-American college men's basketball players
Amateur Athletic Union men's basketball players
American men's basketball players
Basketball players from Oklahoma
Centers (basketball)
Forwards (basketball)
Kansas Jayhawks men's basketball players
Sportspeople from Lawrence, Kansas